The Cardueae are a tribe of flowering plants in the daisy family (Asteraceae) and the subfamily Carduoideae.  Most of them are commonly known as thistles; four of the best known genera are Carduus, Cynara (containing the widely eaten artichoke), Cirsium, and Onopordum.

They are annual, biennial, or perennial herbs.  Many species are thorny on leaves, stems, or involucre, and some have laticifers or resin conduits. Almost 80 genera comprising 2500 species are assigned to this tribe, native of temperate regions of Europe and Asia (especially the Mediterranean region and Minor Asia), Australia and tropical Africa; only three genera contain species native to the Americas.

Taxonomy

Cardueae is a synonym for Cynareae, but the name Cynareae was published almost a decade earlier, so has precedence.

Some authors have divided the plants traditionally held to be in this tribe into three tribes: Cynareae in the narrow sense, Carlineae, and Echinopeae.  However, other authors have retained the traditional broader classification.

Subtribes and genera

Arctiinae Garcia-Jacas & Susanna
Arctium 
Cousinia 
Berardiinae Garcia-Jacas & Susanna
Berardia 
Cardopatiinae Less.
Cardopatium 
Cousiniopsis 
Carduinae Dumort.
× Carduogalactites 
× Cirsio-carduus 
Carduus 
Cirsium 
Cynara 
Galactites 
Lamyropsis 
Notobasis 
Picnomon 
Ptilostemon 
Silybum 
Tyrimnus 
Carlininae Dumort.
Atractylis 
Atractylodes 
Carlina 
Thevenotia 
Tugarinovia 
Centaureinae Dumort.
Amberboa 
Callicephalus 
Carduncellus 
Carthamus 
Centaurea 
Centaurodendron 
Centaurothamnus 
Cheirolophus 
Crocodilium 
Crupina 
Femeniasia 
Goniocaulon 
Karvandarina 
Klasea 
Leuzea 
Mantisalca 
Myopordon 
Nikitinia 
Oligochaeta 
Phalacrachena 
Phonus 
Plagiobasis 
Plectocephalus 
Psephellus 
Rhaponticoides 
Russowia 
Schischkinia 
Serratula 
Stizolophus 
Tricholepis 
Volutaria 
Zoegea 
Dipterocominae Garcia-Jacas & Susanna
Dipterocome 
Echinopsinae Dumort.
Echinops 
Onopordinae Garcia-Jacas & Susanna
Alfredia 
Ancathia 
Lamyropappus 
Olgaea 
Onopordum 
Synurus 
Syreitschikovia 
Xanthopappus 
Saussureinae Garcia-Jacas & Susanna
Dolomiaea 
Jurinea 
Polytaxis 
Saussurea 
Staehelininae Garcia-Jacas & Susanna
Staehelina 
Xerantheminae Cass. ex Dumort.
Amphoricarpos 
Chardinia 
Shangwua 
Siebera 
Xeranthemum

References

 
Asteraceae tribes
Taxa named by Jean-Baptiste Lamarck